The Gulf of Guinea is the northeasternmost part of the tropical Atlantic Ocean from Cape Lopez in Gabon, north and west to Cape Palmas in Liberia. The intersection of the Equator and Prime Meridian (zero degrees latitude and longitude) is in the gulf.

Among the many rivers that drain into the Gulf of Guinea are the Niger and the Volta. The coastline on the gulf includes the Bight of Benin and the Bight of Bonny.

Name
The origin of the name Guinea is thought to be an area in the region, although the specifics are disputed. Bovill (1995) gives a thorough description:

The name "Guinea" was also applied to south coast of West Africa, north of the Gulf of Guinea, which became known as "Upper Guinea", and the west coast of Southern Africa, to the east, which became known as "Lower Guinea". The name "Guinea" is still attached to the names of three countries in Africa: Guinea, Guinea-Bissau, and Equatorial Guinea, as well as New Guinea in Melanesia.

Geography
The main river shedding its waters in the gulf is the Niger River.

Different definitions of the geographic limits of the Gulf of Guinea are given; the International Hydrographic Organization defines the southwest extent of the Gulf of Guinea as "B line from Cap Lopez, in Gabon, northwestward to Ihléu Gago Coutinho (Ilhéu das Rôlas); and thence a line from Ihléu Gago Coutinho northwestward to Cape Palmas, in Liberia.

Islands in the Gulf of Guinea
The Gulf of Guinea contains a number of islands, the largest of which are in a southwest-northeast chain, forming part of the Cameroon line of volcanoes.

Annobón, also known as Pagalu or Pigalua, is an island that is part of Equatorial Guinea.

Bobowasi Island is an island off the west coast of Africa in the Gulf of Guinea that is part of the Western Region of Ghana.

Bioko is an island off the Ambazonian region of Cameroon in the Gulf of Guinea under the sovereignty of Equatorial Guinea.

Corisco is an island belonging to Equatorial Guinea.

Elobey Grande and Elobey Chico are two small islands belonging to Equatorial Guinea.

São Tomé and Príncipe (officially the Democratic Republic of São Tomé and Príncipe) is a Portuguese-speaking island nation in the Gulf of Guinea that became independent from Portugal in 1975. It is located off the western equatorial coast of Africa and consists of two islands, São Tomé and Príncipe. Both islands are part of an extinct volcanic mountain range. São Tomé, the sizeable southern island, is situated just north of the Equator.

Maritime security 
Maritime security in the Gulf of Guinea consists of 18 sovereign states. Multiple institutional mandates address maritime security in the Gulf of Guinea: The Economic Community of West African States (ECOWAS) and the Economic Community of Central African States (ECCAS). Additionally, maritime security in the Gulf of Guinea is also addressed by the Gulf of Guinea Commission (GGC). Maritime security in the Gulf of Guinea is characterised not only by piracy but by a myriad of maritime crimes despite piracy often dominating the conversation on maritime security. According to the ‘Priority Paper for the Danish Efforts to Combat Piracy and Other Types of Maritime Crime 2019-2022’ piracy and maritime crime are defined as follows:Piracy can be defined as any illegal act of violence, detention or depredation committed for private ends at high seas against another ship or aircraft. Maritime crime may include armed robbery at sea, trafficking of humans or smuggling of illicit goods, drugs and weapons, illegal fishing, fuel theft and more.The other notable crimes in the Gulf of Guinea are illegal fishing, kidnap for ransom, drug trafficking and oil-bunkering. Illegal oil-bunkering consists of the attacking of vessels transporting oil and transferring the oil to the thieves’ own vessel. After which the oil is sold in local and international markets.

Kidnapping for ransom is one of the most prevalent maritime crimes in the region. Between 2018 and 2019, the number of crew members that were kidnapped in the Gulf of Guinea increased by 50%, leading the region to account for 90% of global kidnappings at sea.

See also

Benin
Cameroon
Equatorial Guinea
Gabon
Ghana
Guinea (region)
Guineaman, a ship used to transport slaves from the region of Guinea
Nigeria
Null Island
Togo
Whales in Ghanaian waters

References

External links

 The Gulf of Guinea Commission – CGG – GGC

 
Bodies of water of Benin
Bodies of water of Cameroon
Bodies of water of Equatorial Guinea
Bodies of water of Gabon
Bodies of water of Ghana
Bodies of water of Nigeria
Bodies of water of Togo
Guinea
Guinea
Tropical Atlantic